Andora railway station is a railway station serving the town of Andora, in Liguria, northwestern Italy. The station is located on the Genoa–Ventimiglia railway and was opened on 11 December 2016. The train services are operated by Trenitalia.

The station was built to replace the former station Andora dating from 1872. The station was opened as part of an 18.8 km new double-track railway between Andora and San Lorenzo which operates largely through tunnels, rather than winding along the coast.

Train services
The station is served by the following service(s):

Regional services (Treno regionale) Ventimiglia – Savona – Genoa – Sestri Levante – La Spezia – San Stefano di Magra

See also

History of rail transport in Italy
List of railway stations in Liguria
Rail transport in Italy
Railway stations in Italy

References

External links

This article is based upon a translation of the Italian language version as at May 2017.

Buildings and structures in the Province of Savona
Railway stations in Liguria
Railway stations opened in 2016
2016 establishments in Italy
Railway stations in Italy opened in the 21st century